Bozell may refer to:

Bozell, an American advertising agency based in Omaha, Nebraska
People
Leo B. Bozell (1886–1946), American advertising executive, co-founder of Bozell
L. Brent Bozell Jr. (1926–1997), American conservative activist and Catholic writer
Patricia Buckley Bozell (1927 – 2008), American writer
L. Brent Bozell III (born 1955), conservative author and activist, founder of the Media Research Center